Johnson Township is one of fourteen townships in Clinton County, Indiana. As of the 2010 census, its population was 511 and it contained 209 housing units.  The township was named for Richard M. Johnson, a military officer and later vice president of the United States.

History
Johnson Township, established in March 1843 by the county commissioners, was one of the later areas of the county to be settled, it being originally included in the Big Miami Reserve and not open to white settlement until after the cession of 1838.  The township's first white settlers were brothers George, William and Charles Thomas who arrived in 1839 and for two years were the only residents.

The township's early social and business center was Burget's Corner two and a half miles north of Scircleville which had a general store and a post office that remained in operation for over 30 years.  The building housing the store and post office was later moved to Scircleville and used as a saloon.  Berlin, another early settlement that was platted in 1847 in the southeastern part of the township, also faded into extinction during the 19th century.

Geography
A Norfolk Southern rail line runs east and west through the southern part of the township, connecting Frankfort and Tipton. The line previously operated as the Lake Erie and Western Railroad and the Nickel Plate.

Unincorporated towns
 Hillisburg
 Scircleville

Adjacent townships
 Forest Township (north)
 Prairie Township, Tipton County (northeast)
 Jefferson Township, Tipton County (east)
 Sugar Creek Township (south)
 Kirklin Township (southwest)
 Michigan Township (west)

Cemeteries
The township contains seven cemeteries: Bacon, Baker, Merrit, Plummer, Prairie Chapel, Scott and Stroup.

References
 
 United States Census Bureau cartographic boundary files

Townships in Clinton County, Indiana
Townships in Indiana
1843 establishments in Indiana
Populated places established in 1843